Konstantynówka may refer to the following places:
Konstantynówka, Lublin Voivodeship (east Poland)
Konstantynówka, Gmina Giby in Podlaskie Voivodeship (north-east Poland)
Konstantynówka, Gmina Sejny in Podlaskie Voivodeship (north-east Poland)